Microvasculitis refers to a range of diseases or presentations associated with a disease, where there is inflammation of small blood vessels:
 Kawasaki disease
 Susac syndrome

Nerve microvasculitis
 Non-systemic vasculitic neuropathy (NSVN)
 Hepatitis C-related cryoglobulinemia neuropathy (CRYOVASC)
 Hepatitis B-associated PAN
 Diabetic lumbosacral radiculoplexus neuropathy (DLRPN)
 Non-diabetic lumbosacral radiculoplexus neuropathy (LRPN)
 Diabetic cervical-radiculoplexus neuropathy (DCRPN)
 Diabetic Cranio-Cervico-Radiculoplexus Neuropathy
 Diabetic Cervical Neuropathy

References

Vascular diseases